Shiloh, Alabama may refer to several places:

Shiloh, DeKalb County, Alabama, a town in DeKalb County, Alabama, United States
Shiloh, Marengo County, Alabama, an unincorporated community in Marengo County, Alabama, United States

es:Shiloh (Alabama)